Tomopleura retusispirata is a species of sea snail, a marine gastropod mollusk in the family Borsoniidae.

Description
The length of the shell attains 7.9 mm, its width 2.7 mm. The elongate-subfusiform shell has a pale pink color and contains 8 whorls, of which two are contained in the vitreous protoconch. The next 5 whorls are bicarinate. Around the middle of each whorl there is a single nodose liration. The body whorl is rounded at its perifery and forms a short, recurved siphonal canal. The small aperture contains 6 - 7 spiral lirae. The margin of the outer lip is slightly crenulated. The middle of the columella shows two weak pleats. The base of the columella is torsed towards the inner lip.

Distribution
This marine species occurs off South Africa.

References

 R.N. Kilburn (1986), Turridae (Mollusca: Gastropoda) of southern Africa and Mozambique. Part 3. Subfamily Borsoniinae; Ann. Natal Mus. Vol. 27(2) pp. 633–720

External links
 

Endemic fauna of South Africa
retusispirata
Gastropods described in 1877